was a town located in Minamikanbara District, Niigata Prefecture, Japan.

As of 2003, the town had an estimated population of 11,656 and a density of 257.76 persons per km². The total area was 45.22 km².

On May 1, 2005, Sakae, along with the village of Shitada (also from Minamikanbara District), was merged into the expanded city of Sanjō.

Dissolved municipalities of Niigata Prefecture
Sanjō, Niigata